TER Aquitaine was the regional rail network serving the Aquitaine région, France. In 2017 it was merged into the new TER Nouvelle-Aquitaine.

Network

Rail

Road 
 Agen – Villeneuve-sur-Lot
 Ossès – Saint-Étienne-de-Baïgorry
 Dax – Mauléon
 Bordeaux – Pauillac – Le Verdon
 Mont-de-Marsan – Hagetmau
 Mont-de-Marsan – Marmande
 Mont-de-Marsan – Agen
 Buzy – Artouste
 Oloron-Sainte-Marie – Canfranc
 Dax – Mont-de-Marsan – Tarbes

Rolling stock 
The quantity is given when known

Multiple units
 SNCF Class Z 5300
 26 SNCF Class Z 7300
 6 SNCF Class Z 21500
 SNCF Class X 2200
 SNCF Class X 2800
 12 SNCF Class X 72500
 12 SNCF Class X 73500
 14 SNCF Class B 81500

Locomotives
 SNCF Class BB 8500
 SNCF Class BB 9300
 SNCF Class BB 67400

See also
SNCF
Transport express régional
Réseau Ferré de France
List of SNCF stations
List of SNCF stations in Aquitaine
Aquitaine

References

External links 
TER Aquitaine website

 
TER